Amy West (born 10 April 1997) is an English professional footballer who plays as a midfielder for  FA Women's National League North club Nottingham Forest.

West started her career at Aston Villa, being promoted from the academy in 2014.

Club career 
She made her top flight debut coming on as a substitute against Reading on 13 September 2020.

In the 2018–19 season, West was announced as Aston Villia's ladies player of the season after an impressive season.

Career statistics

Club

Notes

References

1997 births
Living people
English women's footballers
Women's association football midfielders
Aston Villa W.F.C. players
Women's Championship (England) players
Women's Super League players